The South Riding of Lindsey was a division of the Parts of Lindsey, in Lincolnshire, England.  It consisted of the eastern part of the county, and included the Calceworth, Candleshoe, Gartree, Hill, Louth-Eske and Wraggoe wapentakes.

Former subdivisions of Lincolnshire
Parts of Lindsey